Barneburg Hill is a summit in the U.S. state of Oregon.

Barneburg Hill was named for the local Barneburg family.

References

Mountains of Jackson County, Oregon
Mountains of Oregon